The German submarine U-156 was a Type IXC U-boat of Nazi Germany's Kriegsmarine built for service during World War II. The keel for this boat was laid on 11 October 1940 at the DeSchiMAG AG Weser yard in Bremen, Germany, as yard number 998. She was commissioned on 4 September 1941 under the command of Kapitänleutnant Werner Hartenstein (Knight of the Iron Cross). The city of Plauen, Hartenstein's home city, adopted the submarine within the then popular sponsorship programme (Patenschaftsprogramm), organising gifts and holidays for the crew.

The U-boat took part in five patrols, which included attacks on shipping in which she sank twenty merchantmen (including the SS Quaker City), damaged another three merchantmen, and damaged the American destroyer . An attack on the oil refinery on the island of Aruba was also attempted, but abandoned when her naval gun exploded.

Whilst rescuing the survivors and flying the Red Cross flag, the U-boat was attacked by an American aircraft and forced to dive, resulting in the shipwrecked survivors being cast back into the sea. The incident led to the Laconia Order, banning U-boats from attempting rescues, and later caused major embarrassment to the US during the Nuremberg trials.

U-156 was attacked with depth charges by an American aircraft east of the island of Barbados on 8 March 1943. She sank with the loss of all hands.

Design
German Type IXC submarines were slightly larger than the original Type IXBs. U-156 had a displacement of  when at the surface and  while submerged. She had two shafts and two  propellers.

U-156 was fitted with six  torpedo tubes (four fitted at the bow and two at the stern), 22 torpedoes, one  SK C/32 naval gun, 180 rounds, and a  SK C/30 as well as a  C/30 anti-aircraft gun. The boat had a complement of forty-eight.

Service history

Built and commissioned in Bremen, the boat was assigned in September 1941 to the 4th U-boat Flotilla for training. She conducted her first patrol from that same month, during which her crew trained, and at the end of which she arrived at her operations base in Lorient, France, in December 1941. From that moment, she was assigned to the 2. Unterseebootsflottille based at that port; from where all her operational patrols departed.

Aruba attack
During its second patrol, U-156 participated in Operation Neuland, which intended to disrupt traffic in the Caribbean; and included an attack on the oil refinery at Aruba island, ordered by captain Hartenstein.

At the beginning of the attack on the Lago Oil and Transport Company San Nicolaas refinery, the deck gun exploded because the cap or tampion in the muzzle of the gun, which prevented water from entering the barrel, was not removed before firing. This accident saved what was at the time the world's largest refinery.

As a result of the accident, Matrosengefreiter (equivalent to Able Seaman or Leading Seaman) Heinrich Bussinger was killed, and Gunnery Officer Dietrich von dem Borne lost his right leg in the explosion. He was taken below and the boat submerged and left the waters off the coast of Aruba. Von dem Borne was put ashore on the island of Martinique for medical treatment and survived the war. The stop at Martinique, at the time part of Vichy France contributed to the worsening of diplomatic relations between the US and Vichy France.

Laconia incident

On 12 September 1942, U-156 hit the British troopship  on the starboard side with a torpedo. The troopship, carrying 463 officers and crew, 80 civilians, 286 British Army soldiers, 1,793 Italian prisoners of war, and 103 Polish soldiers (guards) off the coast of West Africa, was hit by a second torpedo on Number Two hold and sank. After realising that the passengers were primarily POWs and civilians the U-boat started rescue operations while flying the Red Cross flag. A U.S. Army Air Corps bomber flying out of a secret South Atlantic airbase on Ascension Island attacked the U-boat. The U-boat abandoned the rescue effort and left the survivors to drift to Africa. Over half the survivors died. This incident led to German Admiral Karl Dönitz issuing the Laconia Order on 17 September 1942, which forbade submarine commanders from rescuing survivors from torpedoed ships.

Fate
During her fifth patrol, in which she sank no shipping and made no attacks, U-156 was attacked twice. As a result of the second attack, on 8 March 1943, she was sunk approximately 280 nautical miles east of the island of Barbados, in position , by a US PBY Catalina from VP-53 captained by Lieutenant E. Dryden.
Two were observed to hit the water  to  starboard and just aft of U-156, lifting it and breaking it in two, followed by an explosion. At least eleven survivors were seen swimming in the water. Two rubber rafts and rations were dropped, and five men were seen to reach one of the rafts.  was dispatched from Trinidad to rescue the survivors; the search was abandoned on 12 March 1943.

Patrols

Note : Kptlt.=Kapitänleutnant – K.Kapt.=Korvettenkapitän

Wolfpacks
U-156 took part in one wolfpack, namely:
 Eisbär (25 August – 1 September 1942)

Summary of raiding history

References

Notes

Citations

Bibliography

 Röll, Hans-Joachim (2011). Korvettenkapitän Werner Hartenstein: Mit U 156 auf Feindfahrt und der Fall "Laconia" (in German). Würzburg, Germany: Flechsig. .

External links

1941 ships
German Type IX submarines
Ships built in Bremen (state)
U-boats commissioned in 1941
U-boats sunk by US aircraft
U-boats sunk by depth charges
U-boats sunk in 1943
World War II shipwrecks in the Atlantic Ocean
World War II submarines of Germany
Ships lost with all hands
Maritime incidents in March 1943